Acacia binervata, commonly known as two-veined hickory, is a shrub or tree that is endemic to eastern Australia.

Description
The glabrous branchlets are angled toward the apices.

It has phyllodes instead of true leaves which have two prominent veins (giving the plant its species name binervata). It blooms between August and November producing inflorescences that occur in groups of three to twelve in the axillary racemes. The firmly papery to leathery seed pods that form after flowering are straight and flat and can be constricted between the seeds.

Taxonomy
The species was first formally described by the botanist Augustin Pyramus de Candolle in 1825 as part of the work Leguminosae. Prodromus Systematis Naturalis Regni Vegetabilis. It was later reclassified as Racosperma binervatum in 1987 by Leslie Pedley then transferred back to genus Acacia in 2014. The only other synonym is Acacia umbrosa.

Distribution
The plant is found down the east coast of Australia from south east Queensland through much of coastal New South Wales. It is found from around Narooma in southern New South Wales to around Mittagong in the west up to around the Mount Tambourine area in southern Queensland. It grows on moist sites in sandy or basaltic soils as a part of tall sclerophyll forest or on the margins of rainforest communities.

Cultivation
The plant can be grown from seed, though the seed must be scarified prior to planting. It is a hardy and fast growing plant that copes well in damp areas and prefers full sun or part shade positions. It is a dense shade tree or shelter tree or hedge that is frost hardy.

Plant pathogen and fungal species Sarcostroma acaciae is found on various species of Acacia including Acacia binervata in Australia. They cause leaf spots.

See also
 List of Acacia species

References 

binervata
Trees of Australia
Fabales of Australia
Flora of New South Wales
Flora of Queensland
Plants described in 1852
Taxa named by Augustin Pyramus de Candolle